Baltimore Bombers may refer to:

Baltimore Bombers (NALL), a former semi-professional indoor lacrosse team
Baltimore Bombers (NFL), a proposed NFL expansion team